Rhipidogyridae is an extinct family of stony corals (hexacorals).

Overview of genera 
 †Barysmilia Milne-Edwards & Haime 1848
 †Bodeurina Beauvais 1980
 †Codonosmilia Koby 1888
 †Cymosmilia Koby 1894
 †Ironella Krasnov & Starostina, 1970
 †Orbignygyra Alloiteau 1952
 †Paraacanthogyra Morycowa and Marcopoulou-Diacantoni 1997
 †Phytogyra <small>dOrbigny 1849</small>
 †Placohelia Pocta 1887
 †Psammogyra Fromentel 1862
 †Pseudoironella Sikharulidze 1979
 †Psilogyra Felix 1903
 †Rhipidosmilia Geyer 1955
 †Saltocyathus Morycowa & Masse 1998
 †Somalica Parona and Zuffardi-Comerci 1931
 †Tiaradendron'' Quenstedt 1857

References 

 Description de la faune jurassique du Portugal: Polypiers du Jurassique supérieur. FL Koby, P Choffat - 1905
 Sur les polypiers jurassiques des environs de St.-Vallier-de-Thiey. FL Koby - 1905
 Mexican Cretaceous coral species (Cnidaria, Anthozoa, Scleractinia) described as new by Filkorn & Pantoja-Alor (2009), but deemed 'unpublished' under the International Code of Zoological Nomenclature: republication of data necessary for nomenclatural availability. Harry F. Filkorn and Jerjes Pantoja-Alor (2015), Bulletin of Zoological Nomenclature. 72 (1), pages 93–101

 
Prehistoric cnidarian families
Extant Jurassic first appearances